Singkíl (or Sayaw sa Kasingkil) is a folk dance of the Maranao people of Lake Lanao depicting one of the episodes in the epic poem Darangen, which was popularised by the Bayanihan Philippine National Folk Dance Company.

Description

Singkil originated from the Maranao people who inhabit the shores of Lake Lanao. It is a re-telling of an episode from the Maranao epic legend Darangen involving the rescue of Princess Gandingan (abducted by diwata) by the legendary Prince Bantugan. It is a popular dance performed during celebrations and other festive entertainment. Originally only women, particularly royalty, danced the Singkil, which serves as either a conscious or unconscious advertisement to potential suitors. The dance takes its name from the heavy rings worn on the ankles of the Muslim princess.  A kulintang and agung ensemble always accompanies the dance.

The female lead dancer plays the role of Princess Gandingan of the Darangen epic, wearing the heavy rings around her ankles to keep time while she dances. In an episode of the Maranao epic, the princess is caught in the middle of the forest during an earthquake caused by the diwatas (or the guardian spirits) of the Kingdom of Bumbaran. The diwatas abducted the princess and entrapped her into a forest to teach the philandering Prince Bantugan a lesson. The falling trees during the earthquake (which the princess gracefully avoids) are represented by the bamboo poles arranged in a criss-crossed fashion and clacked together in a unique, syncopated rhythm. During the performance, the female lead dancer graciously steps in and out of the bamboo poles as she manipulates two elaborately designed fans called apir. Another female dancer represents the loyal slave of the princess who accompanies her throughout the ordeal. After a while, a male dancer, representing the legendary Prince Bantugan of the Darangen epic, performs his dance round and through the bamboo poles clacked together bearing a shield and a sword. The entrance of the male dancer symbolizes the arrival of Prince Bantugan who is determined to rescue the princess from the diwatas. Other dancers skillfully manipulate the apir fans, which represent the winds which prove to be auspicious. The dance steps require agile movement so that the dancer's feet won't be crushed by the moving bamboos. Meanwhile, the clacking bamboo poles represent the forces which the two characters had to overcome. The dance ends with the princess going home with the prince.

Adaptations

Bayanihan
When the Bayanihan Dance Company began performing the Singkíl, the traditional dance was adapted to convey Western aesthetics. The Bayanihan portrayal, branded as the Princess Dance or the Royal Maranao Fan Dance, became so popular that it is often mistaken for the authentic version of the dance.

A notable variation from the original is its inclusion of male dancers, as pole clappers and in the role of the Prince, Rajah Bantugan. Additional sets of criss-crossing bamboo poles were also added.

Further adaptation divided the dance into four movements: 
First movement – "Asik", where the slave with umbrella is introduced.  
Second movement – entrance of Putri Gandingan, the entourage of female fan or scarf dancers, and the arrival of Rajah Bantugan.  
Third movement – Patay, which is a slow section, and is a structural dance convention often found in Western performances.  
Fourth movement – the climax in which all dancers dance to the crescendo of music.

Other versions
PCN (Pilipino Cultural Night) festivities held by foreign-based student groups and other theatrical dance companies have modernised interpretations of the dance, resulting in unorthodox portrayals of  the Singkíl by even the most esteemed of Philippine folk dance choreographers.

The Philippine Barangay Folkdance Troupe portrays the prince dancing scarves rather than with a sword and a shield.

Some dance companies have even fused the Singkíl with ballet, or make use of multiple layers of overlapping bamboos.

In film
The Singkíl was performed in the 2001 American independent film The Debut. The movie was directed by Filipino American filmmaker Gene Cajayon and starred Dante Basco. The film captured the essence of Filipino traditions and the blending of these with modern American culture.

See also
 Tinikling, a similar Spanish-era Filipino folk dance using bamboo poles
 Maharadia Lawana, the Maranao version of the Ramayana epic
 Maranao people

References

Dances of the Philippines
Culture of Lanao del Sur
Southeast Asian culture